Durban railway station is the central railway station in the city of Durban, South Africa, located between Umgeni Road and Masabalala Yengwa Avenue just to the north of the central business district. It is the terminus of Shosholoza Meyl long-distance services from Johannesburg and Cape Town, and the hub of a network of Metrorail commuter rail services that stretch as far as KwaDukuza (Stanger) to the north, Kelso to the south, and Cato Ridge inland.

References

Transport in Durban
Buildings and structures in Durban
Metrorail (South Africa) stations
Shosholoza Meyl stations